Imran Riaz Khan (Punjabi, Urdu: عمران ریاض خان born 29 December 1975, Faisalabad) is a Pakistani journalist, television anchor, and Youtuber.

Journalism career 
He started his career as a news anchor and journalist on the Express News channel. He started his YouTube channel "Imran Riaz Khan" in 2020, which as of October 2022 has more than 3.48 million subscribers.

As a current affairs host he has also worked with the television channels GNN, and Samaa TV.

Arrest 
While entering Islamabad Toll Plaza on 5 July 2022, he was driving "to the federal capital to get bail from the Islamabad High Court," and was arrested when Punjab Police surrounded his car before he could pass out of Punjab jurisdiction, despite being aware of court orders by the Islamabad and Lahore High Courts, and issuances of protective pre-arrest bail grants, intended to avoid an arrest of the journalist. Riaz later uploaded a video on YouTube stating that if he is not released, he will release the names of everyone who is behind the alleged regime change operation in which foreign influence provoked a constitutional crisis, ultimately ending with the PTI government of Imran Khan being ousted, when the former Prime Minister was removed from office in what he calls an "American conspiracy" against the sovereignty of Pakistan.

A day before his arrest, Riaz was critical of the Shehbaz Sharif-led government and uploaded a video to YouTube, in which Dawn News said Riaz "directly addressed Chief of Army Staff General Qamar Javed Bajwa and alleged that he was threatened after asking questions from military sources about the country's current political and economic situation." Riaz also indicated that his family is the target of threats.

Former Prime Minister of Pakistan Imran Khan strongly protested the "arbitrary arrest" and called on the public as well as the media to "unite and stand up against this fascism." Former official Asad Umar stated that PTI party workers will stage protests at press clubs throughout the country for what he said is an "attempt to suppress freedom of expression". Immediately following the arrest, reports showed a wide condemnation of the treatment and expressions of concern stemming from similar ideological grounds favoring free speech, including that of academic and activist Ammar Ali Jan, who warned of the irrationality in "clumsy" uses of force in a "battle of ideas."

He was released on bail on 9 July 2022, by Lahore High Courts' Judge Justice Baqar Najafi. His name was added to the Exit Control List by the FIA on the request of the police.

He was arrested again on Feb 2nd, 2023

References 

Living people
Pakistani television journalists
Pakistani YouTubers
News YouTubers
1975 births
Crime journalists
Pakistani male journalists
Pakistani television talk show hosts
Pakistani investigative journalists